A pirate is a person who commits acts of piracy at sea without the authorization of any nation.

Pirate(s) or piracy may also refer to:

Arts, entertainment and media

Fictional characters
 Air pirate, a character archetype in science fiction and fantasy
 List of fictional pirates
 Space pirate, a character archetype in science fiction

Films
 Pirates (1986 film), an adventure/comedy directed by Roman Polanski
 Pirates (2005 film), a pornographic film
 Pirates (2021 film), a British film
 Pirates II: Stagnetti's Revenge (2008), a pornographic film
 Pirates 4-D, a 1999 3-D short attraction film primarily used in theme parks
 Pirates of the Caribbean (film series)
 The Pirate (1948 film), an American musical film
 The Pirate (1973 film), a Hong Kong film
 The Pirate (1978 film), an American TV movie directed by Ken Annakin
 The Pirate (1984 film), a French film
 The Pirates (2014 film), a South Korean period/adventure film
 The Pirates! In an Adventure with Scientists! (2012), a British/American 3D stop-motion animated swashbuckler comedy film
 The Pirate Movie (1982), an Australian musical film based on The Pirates of Penzance

Games and toys
 Lego Pirates, a Lego theme launched in 1989
 Pirate game, a puzzle of logic and mathematics
 Pirates Constructible Strategy Game, a tabletop game
 Pirates: Duels on the High Seas, a 2008 Nintendo DS video game
 Pirates of the Burning Sea, a massively multiplayer online role-playing game
 Pirates: The Key of Dreams, a 2008 Wii video game
 Pop-up Pirate, a children's game in which a pirate is forced to exit a barrel through simulated torture
 Sid Meier's Pirates!, a 1987 video game
 Sid Meier's Pirates! (2004 video game), a remake of the 1987 game

Music
 "Pirate" (Cher song),  from the album Cherished
 Pirates (album), by Rickie Lee Jones
 Johnny Kidd & the Pirates, a British rock and roll group
 "Pirate", a song by Everglow
 "Pirates", a song by Emerson, Lake & Palmer on their album Works Volume 1
 "Pirates", a song by Jolin Tsai on her album Castle
 "Pirates", a song by Caravan Palace on the album Panic
 The Pirates (opera), by Stephen Storace
 The Pirates of Penzance, comic opera by Gilbert and Sullivan

Literature
 Die Seeraeuber ('The Pirate'), a play by Ludwig Fulda and the basis of Behrman's play
 The Pirate (novel), an 1821 novel by Sir Walter Scott
 "The Pirate" (short story), a science fiction story by Poul Anderson
 The Pirate (1942), a play by S. N. Behrman
 The Pirate (1974), a novel by Harold Robbins

 Piracy (comics), published from 1954 to 1955

Criminal or unauthorized acts
 Aircraft hijacking
 Broadcast signal intrusion
 Copyright infringement
 Cable television piracy
 Music piracy
 Pirate decryption
 Video game piracy

 Patent pirate (disambiguation)
 Unlicensed broadcasting, including:
 Pirate radio
 Pirate television

People
 List of pirates
 Marco Pantani, professional cyclist nicknamed "Il Pirata" (The Pirate)

Ships
 Pirate (dinghy), a type of sailing boat
 Pirate (steamboat), 1839
 USS Pirate, any of several U.S. Navy ships bearing the name
 Pirate, an R-class sloop and landmark in South Lake Union, Seattle

Sports

United Kingdom
 Bristol Rovers F.C., a football team, nicknamed the Pirates
 Cornish Pirates, a rugby team
 Croydon Pirates, a baseball team
 East Kilbride Pirates, an American football team
 Essex Pirates, a basketball team
 Poole Pirates, a motorcycle speedway team

United States
 East Carolina Pirates, the sports teams of East Carolina University
 Hampton Pirates, the sports teams of Hampton University
 Pittsburgh Pirates (NHL), a hockey team existing from 1925–30
 Pittsburgh Pirates, a Major League Baseball team
 Pittsburgh Steelers, an NFL football team, known as the Pittsburgh Pirates from 1933–39
 Portland Pirates, a minor league hockey team
 Seton Hall Pirates, the sports teams of Seton Hall University

Other countries
 Nishi Nippon Pirates, a former professional Japanese baseball team
 Orlando Pirates FC, a South African football team
 Lyceum Pirates, NCAA Philippines team of Lyceum of the Philippines University
 Pirate City Rollers, a Roller Derby team from Auckland, New Zealand

Other uses
 Pirate (butterfly), Catacroptera cloanthe
 Pirate (sexual slang)
 Pirate Party, various political parties around the world
 EuroFIRST PIRATE (Passive Infra-Red Airborne Track Equipment), a tracking system for the Eurofighter Typhoon aircraft
Vought F6U Pirate, an American jet fighter

See also
 
 
 Anti-piracy (disambiguation)
 Pirates! (disambiguation)
 Pyrates (disambiguation)